is a Japanese actor, known primary for his roles in Japanese television drama.

Biography
He was born into a family of a sake brewery in Kyoto, Japan. After graduating from Kobe University and resigning from an advertising agency, he played an active part in a Japanese theatrical group called "Planet Pistachio," as a stage actor, from 1990 to 1998.

He later extended the range of activities on TV dramas and movies, and has played important roles on many works in Japan. He made his film debut starring in Mamiya Kyodai in 2006, and his TV series debut starring in Gira Gira in 2008.

When Sasaki was a freshman and received a phone call from his college company to decide on a stage name, his father suggested the name Kuranosuke, with a double meaning; for Kura, a sake cellar/brewery for their sake brewery, and for Ōuchi Kuranosuke, a famous historical drama role.

Sasaki's initial plan was to join the family business of sake brewing as the eldest son when graduated from college. Learning sales strategy at an advertisement company was also part of his plan.

His family was not supportive when he aspired to be an actor, until he played a part in Audrey (NHK, 2000). His father sold sake named "Audrey", and then a premium junmai sake Hancho for a limited period while the TV drama was aired; Kuranosuke played a lead in Hancho.

Selected filmography

TV series

Movies

Awards
2015 the 38th Japan Academy Prize (film award) - the Best Actor, Samurai Hustle

Advertisements

Television 
2016 Suntory non-alcohol beverage
2016 Kansai Electric Power Company

References

External links
 
  

1968 births
Living people
21st-century Japanese male actors
Japanese male television actors
Japanese male film actors
Male actors from Kyoto
Kobe University alumni